The list of ship decommissionings in 2019 includes a chronological list of ships decommissioned in 2019.

References

2019
 
Ships